John Alexander Cameron (29 November 1929 – 13 July 2008) was an English professional footballer who played as a wing-half for Motherwell and Bradford (Park Avenue).

References

1929 births
2008 deaths
Footballers from Greenock
Scottish footballers
Association football wing halves
English Football League players
Motherwell F.C. players
Bradford (Park Avenue) A.F.C. players
Scottish Football League players